Little Arkansaw (also known as Jennings) is an unincorporated community in Boone County, Arkansas, United States.

References

Unincorporated communities in Boone County, Arkansas
Unincorporated communities in Arkansas
Arkansas placenames of Native American origin